The Odeon Theater in Tucumcari, New Mexico is a distinctive Art Deco landmark. It is located on South 2nd Street a few blocks from the town's railroad depot.  The theater was built in 1936, and was listed on the National Register of Historic Places on January 17, 2007.

It is a two-story building with stucco-faced clay tile walls on a concrete foundation.  It has a flat roof with a stepped parapet, with a fluted vertical column rising above.  Its Art Deco elements include its use of glass blocks, of decorative geometrical molding, and of Art Deco style lettering of its neon sign.

References

National Register of Historic Places in New Mexico
Art Deco architecture in New Mexico
Buildings and structures completed in 1936
Quay County, New Mexico
Theatres in New Mexico